Johnny Tsunami is a 1999 Disney Channel Original Movie (DCOM). The film focuses on a young surfer from Hawaii who must adapt to new challenges when his father's job forces the family to move to Vermont. It was nominated in 2000 for the Humanitas Prize in the Children's Live-Action Category. The film was followed by a sequel, Johnny Kapahala: Back on Board, released in 2007.

Plot

Johnny Kapahala, a boy living in Hawaii, is a surfer who has good friends and a happy family, including parents Pete and Melanie, and his paternal grandfather, the famous surf legend Johnny Bartholomew Tsunami. When Pete gets a sudden job transfer, the family is forced to move to Vermont, while Tsunami stays in Hawaii.

In Kapahala's new town, there are two schools: a private school where the students are skiers known as Skies; and the public school where the students are snowboarders known as Urchins. Johnny goes to the skiers' school, but would prefer to snowboard because he thinks it is more like surfing. After some difficulty, Johnny eventually learns how to snowboard with help from a new friend named Sam Sterling.

At his new school, Johnny becomes good friends with a girl named Emily, who is Headmaster Pritchard's daughter. However, a skier named Brett likes Emily too and thinks Johnny is not right for her. The Urchins ride the side of the mountain that belongs to the skiers and are confronted by the Skies. Later, Emily nearly falls off the mountainside while learning how to snowboard with Johnny and his new friends.

A fight ensues between Johnny and Brett regarding the incident, but is immediately dispersed when a snow ranger arrives. After a meeting with his parents and the headmaster concerning the fight with Brett, Sam tells Johnny that he is moving to Iceland, as are his father's orders since he is a first sergeant in the U.S. Marine Corps and relocating also means a promotion to sergeant major. Pete tells Johnny that Sam moving away would be best, as he wants Johnny to fit in with his peers at private school. A fight occurs between Johnny and Pete. Johnny wishes his grandfather were there because he understands him better than Pete; however, Pete feels that Johnny Tsunami – a surf bum – is a bad influence on his son. Johnny and Sam run away from home and fly to Hawaii on a cargo plane to stay with Tsunami. Via telephone, Pete demands the boys be sent home immediately, but Tsunami refuses until they are willing to return. Melanie tells Pete her feelings about him unnecessarily punishing Johnny and tells him he needs to stop forbidding Johnny from his friends and let him snowboard. Pete tries unsuccessfully to defend his actions with Melanie, who reveals that she wishes that he could be the easy-going husband that she once loved, before he became the way he is.

Johnny and Sam enjoy surfing and the warm weather in Hawaii, but they decide to return to Vermont along with Tsunami. Pete is shocked to see his father in Vermont, and the two have a heart-to-heart talk about Pete's punishment in forbidding his son from snowboarding with his friends. Pete admits he went too far in punishing Johnny. Tsunami encourages Pete to go easy on Johnny and let him make his own mistakes so he can learn from them. Tsunami tells Pete the more he tries to punish Johnny, the more resentful he will be towards his father later in life. The next day, Johnny is amazed to learn Tsunami has great snowboarding ability, and they decide to ride the skiers' side of the mountain, where the best rides are.

Brett and his gang encounter Johnny and Tsunami, and decide to have a one-race challenge between Brett and Johnny Kapahala. If Johnny wins the race, then the skiers must share the mountain with the snowboarders. If Brett wins, then he is awarded the Tsunami Medal, a prize given to the best surfer in Hawaii. Pete encourages Johnny to win the race to keep the medal in the family. He wins the race, despite Brett's cheating attempts, allowing him and Emily to begin a relationship. Brett's friends congratulate Johnny and are inspired to learn how to snowboard with the Urchins.

Johnny's parents throw a celebration party. Brothers Randy and Ronnie, who own the opposite sides of the mountain, reveal their story as they were the original Sky and Urchin. Their parents divorced long ago and they could not agree on what should happen when they inherited the mountain after their father died 10 years earlier. The mountain was split between the two, with the Skies having the best rides. Randy and Ronnie decide to reunite the mountain and open a new shop which allows everyone access to the best slopes. The brothers thank Johnny for helping them see the error of their ways.

Cast
 Brandon Baker as Johnny "Pono" Kapahala
 Yuji Okumoto as Pete Kapahala
 Mary Page Keller as Melanie Kapahala
 Lee Thompson Young as Sam Sterling
 Kirsten Storms as Emily Pritchard
 Zachary Bostrom as Brett
 Gregory Itzin as Headmaster Pritchard
 Cylk Cozart as Sergeant Sterling
 Steve Van Wormer as Randy / Ronnie
 Cary-Hiroyuki Tagawa as Grandpa Johnny "Tsunami" Kapahala
 Gabriel Luque as Matt
 Taylor Moore as Jake
 Anthony DiFranco as Eddie
 Noah Bastian as Aaron
 Anne Sward as Miss Arthur
 Kevin Clifford as Garbage Man

Production
The movie was filmed in locations such as Utah, including Brighton Resort for many of the skiing and snowboarding scenes, and Hawaii.

Songs
 "The Way" - Fastball
 "Fire Escape" - Fastball
 "Nowhere Road" - Fastball
 "Rolled" - Jeffries Fan Club
 "Crystal 52" - Jeffries Fan Club
 "So Down" - Jesse Camp and the 8th Street Kidz
 "Life Jacket" - Simon Says

Reception
In 2012, Complex ranked the film at number 2 on the magazine's list of the 25 best Disney Channel Original Movies. In March 2016, the film was ranked at number 35 on MTV's list of the best DCOMs, consisting of 99 films. The same year in May, Aubrey Page of Collider ranked each DCOM released up to that point. Page ranked Johnny Tsunami at number 30 and wrote that it "managed to combine surfing and winter sports into a veritable smorgasbord of sick Disney stunts". That month, Entertainment Weekly ranked it at number 10 on a list of the top 30 DCOMs, with writer Jonathon Dornbush calling the film "one of the most fun" and "finest fish-out-of-water DCOMs around".

References

External links
 

1999 comedy-drama films
1999 television films
1999 films
American comedy-drama television films
Disney Channel Original Movie films
Film Roman television specials
Films directed by Steve Boyum
Films set in Vermont
Films set in Hawaii
Films shot in Hawaii
Films shot in Utah
Snowboarding films
American surfing films
1990s English-language films
1990s American films